There is a community of Nepalese s living and working in Portugal. They consist of expatriates and immigrants from Nepal as well as their locally born descendants. Most of them reside in Lisbon. As of 2019, 1,287 Nepalis acquired the Portuguese citizenship, making them the ninth biggest nationality in Portugal.

Media

Nepali Wave is a Nepali language newspaper that was first published in Lisbon in October 2012 and it was released by the Honorary Consular of Nepal for Portugal, Makar Bahadur Hamal and Chairman of the Nepal-Portugal Art, Literature and Communication Council, Kumar Shrestha on the occasion of the Dashain and Tihar.

Organizations
Non-Resident Nepalese (NRN) Portugal is a Nepalese community organization, founded by the Nepalese community in Portugal.

In April 2012, Nepalis residing in Portugal have started the construction of Nepal House in Lisbon. President of NRN Portugal, Ramesh Kumar Gurung said that the decision was taken by the committee so as to assist in preserving Nepalese traditions and culture.

References

Ethnic groups in Portugal
Portugal
Immigration to Portugal